Chekunda is a rural locality (a selo) in Verkhnebureinsky District of Khabarovsk Krai, Russia, located on the left bank of the Bureya River.

Transportation
Chekunda lies on a branch line that runs from Izvestkovy, on the Trans-Siberian Railway, to Chegdomyn. The line meets with the Baikal-Amur Mainline at Novy Urgal.

Climate
Chekunda has a monsoon-influenced humid continental climate (Köppen climate classification Dwb) with extreme variation in seasonal temperatures. The winters are extreme for a place located at this latitude and colder than many localities from further north. Indeed, Chekunda may be the coldest known location with a humid continental climate. The summers are warm to hot and just long enough to prevent a subarctic climate (Dwc) classification. Precipitation is heavily concentrated in the warmest months.

References

Rural localities in Khabarovsk Krai